Gustaf Nordqvist (12 February 1886 in Stockholm, Sweden – 28 January 1949 in Stockholm, Sweden) was a Swedish composer, church musician and professor. He was organist in Adolf Fredrik church from 1914 and a teacher of harmony at the Royal Conservatory of Music from 1924. As a composer he is best known for his many solo songs, including ‘Till havs’ and Christmas song Jul, jul, strålande jul. In later years, his works drifted increasingly towards the sacred. Gustaf Nordqvist was voted into the Royal Swedish Academy of Music in 1932.

References

1886 births
1949 deaths
Swedish composers
Swedish male composers
Members of the Royal Swedish Academy of Music
20th-century Swedish male musicians